Jamali Colony is neighborhood in the Karachi East district of Karachi, Pakistan. It was previously administered as part of the Gulshan Town borough, which was disbanded in 2011.

There are several ethnic groups in Jamali Colony including Urdu speakers, Sindhis, Kashmiris, Seraikis, Pakhtuns, Balochs, Memons, Bohras, Ismailis. Over 99% of the population is Muslim. The population of Gulshan Town is estimated to be nearly one million.

References

External links
 Karachi Website .

Neighbourhoods of Karachi
Gulshan Town